is a Japanese football player. He currently plays for Montedio Yamagata in the J2 League. His regular playing position is centre-back.

Senior career

Noda made 5 appearances for J2 League outfit Roasso Kumamoto in 2014 and 2015 while he was still in high school.

He joined Gamba Osaka from Ohzu High School in his native Kyushu ahead of the 2016 season. Although he didn't make any senior appearances for Gamba in 2016, he played 27 times and scored 3 goals for Gamba U-23 in J3 League.

2017 saw him make his first senior appearance for Gamba as a 78th minute substitute for Jin Izumisawa in a 2-1 home defeat to Cerezo Osaka in the semi-finals of the J.League Cup. Additionally he played 5 times for Gamba U-23 as the team was run more as a youth team than a reserve team during this campaign.

The following year saw Gamba's Under-23 side revert to being a reserve team and Noda played 26 games to help them to 6th position in the final standings. He also played twice for Gamba's senior side in the J. League Cup quarter-finals against Yokohama F. Marinos.

Career statistics

Last update: 2 December 2018

Reserves performance

References

External links

1997 births
Living people
Association football people from Kumamoto Prefecture
Japanese footballers
J1 League players
J2 League players
J3 League players
Roasso Kumamoto players
Gamba Osaka players
Gamba Osaka U-23 players
Montedio Yamagata players
Association football central defenders